Hits a Poppin was a Canadian music television series which aired on CBC Television in 1968.

Premise
Host Terry David Mulligan presented popular and theatrical songs. The regular performers were The Doug Parker Band and the Numerality Singers.

Scheduling
This half-hour series was broadcast on Sundays at 7:00 p.m. from 4 August to 1 September 1968.

References

External links
 
 

CBC Television original programming
1968 Canadian television series debuts
1968 Canadian television series endings